The third season of Veronica Mars, an American drama television series created by Rob Thomas, began airing on The CW in the United States on October 3, 2006. The season was produced by Warner Bros. Television, Silver Pictures Television, Stu Segall Productions, Inc and Rob Thomas Productions, and Joel Silver, Diane Ruggiero and Thomas served as executive producers. The third season comprises 20 episodes and concluded its initial airing on May 22, 2007.

The season continues the story of Veronica Mars (Kristen Bell), now a freshman studying at Hearst College while moonlighting as a private investigator under the wing of her detective father. The first mystery is established when her friend Parker Lee (Julie Gonzalo) becomes the latest victim of the Hearst serial rapist in a storyline begun in a second-season episode. Feeling guilty for not helping her, Veronica sets herself to catching the rapist. The next mystery, a murder, commences in the same episode that the identity of the rapist is discovered.

To increase viewership, the third season format was changed to include two separate mysteries that would be introduced and resolved in a series of non-overlapping story arcs. Three of the regulars in the second season were written out of the series, two new characters were introduced and two others were upgraded from recurring roles. The third season received generally mixed critical reviews compared to previous seasons.

Cast
The third season features a cast of ten actors who receive billing, an increase from the nine actors in the second. Kristen Bell portrays the titular Veronica Mars, a college student and skilled private detective. Jason Dohring plays Logan Echolls, Veronica's love interest. Ryan Hansen plays Logan's obnoxious friend Dick Casablancas. Percy Daggs III portrays Wallace Fennel, Veronica's best friend and frequent partner in solving mysteries. Francis Capra portrays Eli "Weevil" Navarro, the previous leader of the Pacific Coast Highway (PCH) biker gang and Veronica's friend. Enrico Colantoni plays Veronica's father Keith Mars, a private investigator and former Balboa County Sheriff. 

Cindy "Mac" Mackenzie and Don Lamb, recurring characters in the first two seasons, were upgraded to series regulars in the third. Mac, portrayed by Tina Majorino, was a computer expert befriended by Veronica. Lamb, portrayed by Michael Muhney, was the Balboa County Sheriff who won the office from Keith in the recall election. The third season introduces two new series regulars, Julie Gonzalo portrays Parker Lee and Chris Lowell plays Stosh "Piz" Piznarski. Piz, named after the director of the pilot, Mark Piznarski, was created so that Veronica could have a male friend of middle-class status rather than of upper-class. He is Wallace's roommate and a friend of Veronica, and his campus radio show serves as a narrative device to capture the mood of the university. Parker is Mac's extroverted roommate at Hearst College and "everything that [she] is not", according to Thomas.

Regular characters who did not return for the third season were Duncan Kane (played by Teddy Dunn), who left the country with his daughter midway through the second season, Jackie Cook (Tessa Thompson), who returned to New York, and Cassidy Casablancas (Kyle Gallner), who died by suicide in the season two finale.

Episodes
Veronica is still living at home with her father Keith, and Piz and Parker are introduced as the respective roommates of Veronica's friends Wallace and Mac. Weevil takes a job at Hearst as a maintenance man, while Lamb continues to serve as Sheriff. During the season, Keith begins an affair with a married client, Wallace struggles to balance academics and sports, Mac begins dating again after previous failed relationships, and Dick has a breakdown and appeals to Logan for help. The season chronicles Veronica and Logan's failing attempts to maintain their relationship in the face of Veronica's mistrust.

Reception

Critical response
Reviews of the third season were mixed compared to the previous two seasons. Maureen Ryan of the Chicago Tribune praised Bell's performance, who she said deserved the "truckload of glowing press notices for her work as the tightly wound, emotionally resilient young detective". Ryan thought Veronica's relationship with Keith was "one of the best, if not the best, parent-child relationship on television", and described Logan and Veronica's on-screen chemistry as "sizzling". Stephanie Zacharek of Salon.com felt that although the third season "wasn't the strongest", it did show that Veronica Mars "could not only survive but continue to find ways to reinvigorate itself". Zacharek liked newcomer Piz, and realized how much she was going to miss the character Dick. Melanie McFarland of the Seattle Post-Intelligencer felt that Veronica Mars "easily has a few more seasons left in it", and described the writing as "unfailingly hysterical and clever". McFarland praised the cast as "without a doubt one of the most likable on television", and called Dohring "the most beloved of the bunch".

Keith McDuffee of TV Squad deemed the season "disappointing", mainly because the episodes offered nothing new: "most fans of Veronica Mars felt that season three was clearly its weakest". Eric Goldman of IGN said that the main issue was the shift in the overall tone, with a lighter feeling than the previous seasons. Goldman believed that Logan had been most affected by the tone change; he was robbed of his darker aspects and changed into an "increasingly extraneous character". The reviewer felt that despite the concerns over the final five episodes, the series ended with "three very strong episodes, with lots of strong dialogue". Goldman concluded that although third season "was very choppy", it still had "plenty of witty dialogue and a continually engaging performance by Kristen Bell as the title character". The Pittsburgh Post-Gazette opined that Veronica Mars had taken a dive "creatively", from "the mopier version of its theme song to stalled storylines". The reviewer felt that "the arcing mysteries had grown less convincing and compelling as time went on and were too drawn out". Fox News Channel's Bridget Byrne pointed out that Veronica had "gone from punky to—dare we say—preppy" in the third season.

The review aggregator website Rotten Tomatoes reported an approval rating of 89% with an average score of 8.13/10, based on 18 reviews. The website's critics consensus reads, "The third season of Veronica Mars continues to highlight the show's simple brilliance, offering more of the witty banter and quote-worthy dialogue the series is known for."

Ratings and awards
The third-season premiere was watched by 3.36 million American viewers, an increase from the 2.42 million viewers who viewed the second-season finale. Ratings remained stable for the first ten episodes, and the ninth episode featured the most viewers of the season with 3.44 million. Beginning with the eleventh episode, ratings dropped to a consistent viewership of a mid-2 million per episode, and the final episode before the hiatus was watched by 2.66 million viewers. When the series returned from its hiatus, viewers had decreased to 2.35 million, and the final two episodes garnered only 1.78 and 2.15 million viewers respectively.

The third season averaged 2.5 million viewers for all 20 episodes. Out of all regular primetime programming that aired during the 2006–2007 American television season, Veronica Mars ranked 138th out of 142, according to the Nielsen ratings system. The third season was nominated for two awards: Kristen Bell was nominated for the Saturn Award for Best Actress on Television, and the series was nominated for the Writers Guild of America Award for On-Air Promotion (Radio or Television).

Distribution

The first two seasons of Veronica Mars aired on UPN; however, in 2006, CBS Corporation and Warner Bros. decided to merge UPN and The WB into The CW. Paul Maguire, the spokesman for The CW, said that the series was picked up because "the critics are behind it and our research has consistently shown that Gilmore shared more audience commonality with Veronica than with any other show from UPN, except Top Model". 

The third season was released in the US under the title Veronica Mars: The Complete Third Season as a widescreen six-disc Region 1 DVD box set on October 23, 2007, Region 2 on December 12, 2008, and Region 4 on February 11, 2009. In addition to all of the aired episodes, DVD extras included unaired scenes with introductions by Rob Thomas, a gag reel, and a webisode gallery with cast interviews and various set tours. Also included were the featurettes, "Going Undercover with Rob Thomas" commentary and "Pitching Season 4", an interview with Thomas discussing a new direction for the series that picks up years later, with Veronica as a rookie FBI agent.

The third season was simulcast in Canada by Fox 44. The series had previously been broadcast in Canada by the CTV Television Network and Sun TV. Despite airing the series to low ratings in the previous seasons, the United Kingdom's Living decided to air the series' third season. Network Ten began airing the third season in Australia on March 30, 2007. The series went on hiatus after the fourth episode on April 20, 2007, and resumed on the newly created Ten HD in 2008. The finale was aired on April 8, 2008. The third season was broadcast in New Zealand by TV2.

Cancellation and future
At the 2007 CW Upfront, Ostroff announced that Veronica Mars was not part of the new primetime lineup and was "not coming back". When asked if the series could continue with the FBI concept, Ostroff said that the series was completely gone "in any form". Upon the cancellation of the series, a group of fans calling themselves the "Cloud Watchers" sent more than 10,000 Mars bars to the CW, hoping that the network would reverse its decision and renew the series.

Thomas stated that he was interested in writing a feature film based on the series, in the interest of providing closure to the storylines and character arcs. In September 2008, Thomas told Entertainment Weekly that "I thought I had the idea broken, but I've hit a wall in the final act that I haven't quite figured out". Thomas explained that he was very busy writing for Cupid and Party Down, both of which he created. In January 2009, TV Guide reported that the film was Thomas' first priority after Cupid. Thomas noted that as well as writing the script, someone would need to pay for the film, but indicated that producer Joel Silver was ready to green-light the film. In late March, Thomas stated that although the film was not green-lit by the studio, the possibility was still there. Thomas revealed that the film would take place before Veronica's graduation, and feature Wallace, Logan, Mac and Weevil.

A film continuation, released in early 2014, was confirmed after a successful Kickstarter campaign launched by Rob Thomas which raised over $5.7 million.

In September 2018, an eight-episode fourth season was confirmed by Hulu, which was released on July 19, 2019.

References
General
 
 

Specific

External links
 
 
 Mars Investigations

Veronica Mars episodes
2006 American television seasons
2007 American television seasons